Heliophisma catocalina is a species of moth of the family Noctuidae first described by William Jacob Holland in 1894. It is found in Gabon, Ghana, Tanzania and Nigeria.

References

Catocalinae
Owlet moths of Africa
Moths described in 1894